Step Right Up: The Songs of Tom Waits is the title of a tribute album to Tom Waits, released in 1995 by Manifesto Records. The songs are performed by various artists.

Track listing
All songs written by Tom Waits.

"Old Shoes" – [06:29] Drugstore
"Mockin' Bird" – [04:29] Tindersticks
"Better off Without a Wife" – [03:37] Pete Shelley
"Red Shoes by the Drugstore" – [02:33] Wedding Present
"Step Right Up" – [06:33] Violent Femmes
"Downtown" – [04:56] Alex Chilton
"Big Joe and Phantom 309" (Tommy Faile) – [04:16] Archers of Loaf
"You Can't Unring a Bell" – [05:54] These Immortal Souls
"Pasties and a G-String" – [04:40] Jeffrey Lee Pierce
"Christmas Card from a Hooker in Minneapolis" – [04:29] Magnapop
"Ol' '55" – [03:39] Dave Alvin
"Jersey Girl" – [07:29] Pale Saints
"Martha" – [03:19] Tim Buckley
"Ruby's Arms" – [04:27] Frente!
"I Hope That I Don't Fall in Love with You" – [03:37] 10,000 Maniacs

References

1995 compilation albums
Rock compilation albums
Tom Waits tribute albums
Manifesto Records compilation albums